Charles Bernard may refer to:
 Charles Bernard (surgeon) (c. 1652–1710), Royal surgeon
 Charles Bernard (cricketer) (1876–1953), English right-hand batsman
 Charles Bernard (figure skater) (20th century), American figure skater
 Charles Bernard (civil servant) (1837–1901), administrator in British Burma
 Charles E. Bernard (1893–1979), American aviator and businessman
 Charles T. Bernard (1927–2015), American politician
 Charles Bernard (bishop) (died 1890), Irish Anglican bishop

See also
 Bernard Charlès (born 1957), CEO of Dassault Systemes
 Charles Barnard (disambiguation)
 Charles de Bernard (1804–1850), French writer
 Charles-Bernard (1740–1813), Count of Vorsselaer, Baron of Lichtaert and of Rielen, Lord of Giessen-Oudkerk